The Wadi Laban Bridge is a cable-stayed bridge in Riyadh, Saudi Arabia, designed by Seshadri Srinivasan.  It was built between 1993 and 1997.

References

Cable-stayed bridges in Saudi Arabia
Bridges completed in 1997